Division Avenue High School is a four-year public high school in Levittown, New York. It is one of two traditional high schools in the Levittown Union Free School District and one of four high schools in the hamlet of Levittown in the Town of Hempstead, Nassau County on Long Island. It opened in 1948 as Division Avenue School. It was expanded in 1955 and renamed Division Avenue High School. Its first graduating class was in 1960. It is one of the original school buildings in the district.

John Coscia is the school's principal. There is one assistant principal, Sam McElroy

As of the 2019–20 school year, the school had an enrollment of 1043 students and 97.6 classroom teachers (on an FTE basis), for a student–teacher ratio of 10.3:1. There were 137 students (13.0% of enrollment) eligible for free lunch and 69 (6.6% of students) eligible for reduced-cost lunch.

Awards and recognition
In 2008, Newsweek ranked the school 1,127 on the list of the top 1,300 US schools. In 2007, it was ranked 873. In 2006, it was ranked as 1,059.

The New York State Education Department named DAHS a Reward School for 2015–16.

Extracurricular activities
Division has over 60 after-school clubs available to students:

Sports

Division has over 25 varsity and junior varsity level athletic teams. They include badminton, baseball, basketball (boys' and girls') bowling, football, lacrosse (boys' and girls'), soccer (boys' and girls'), softball, tennis, track and field, volleyball, and wrestling.

The Division Avenue football team were the 1996 New York State Rutgers Cup champions. Division has also racked up many accomplishments in other sports. In recent years, the girls' bowling team has won two county titles, and the wrestling, girls' soccer, and girls' volleyball teams have won conference titles. The baseball, boys' and girls' lacrosse, and softball teams have all advanced to the county semifinals or beyond in the past few years as well. In boys' lacrosse, Division has produced 13 All-Americans, including Maryland's all-time leading goal scorer, Bob Boniello. They were also 2010 Conference B Champs, tied with Garden City and Wantagh for first place. The Division cross country team won back-to-back New York State Class C Championships in 1969–70. The baseball, girls' basketball, and both the boys' and girls' lacrosse teams play in the top conference of their respective classes. During the 2009–2010 school year, both the girls' soccer and girls' basketball teams went to the Nassau County finals. The girls' basketball team defeated Lynbrook for the first county title in the program's history. The Lady Dragons went on to claim the Class A Long Island Championship. In the 2017 season, Division Lady Dragons girls lacrosse was ranked number one in their conference, winning the conference championships.

Division Avenue fields a competitive marching band, composed of students in grades 8-12 from all high schools and middle schools in the Levittown School District. The Marching Band competes in the New York State Field Band Conference, and participates in a yearly championship competition at the JMA Wireless Dome in Syracuse. The band placed first in the Small School 3 Class in 2022, with a championship score of 88.40.

Pressbox/bleacher fire
According to arson/bomb squad detectives, the Levittown Fire Department responded Sunday January 3, 2010 at 2:50 p.m. with five trucks and 50 firefighters to a 911 call for smoke in the vicinity of the concession stand at Division Avenue High School's football field.

The blaze, deemed suspicious, caused "extensive damage" estimated at more than $200,000 to the bleachers, gym equipment, rubberized track, and concession stand. There were no reported injuries. The football field and school were unoccupied at the time of the inferno.

An investigation by the Nassau County Fire Marshal's Office, arson/bomb squad and Eighth Squad was completed in April 2010. The students responsible, who were between the ages of 11 and 13, were reprimanded, and the costs to the property were delegated to the families of the children.

The cause of the fire was ruled as arson with gasoline.

Notable alumni
 Sterling Morrison (1942–1995, class of 1960), guitarist for rock band The Velvet Underground.
 Brandon Reilly (born 1981, class of 1999), lead singer and guitarist for rock band Nightmare of You
 Moe Tucker (born 1944, class of 1961), drummer for rock band The Velvet Underground
 Len Wein (1948–2017), comic-book writer and editor

References

External links
Levittown Public Schools: Division Avenue High School

Educational institutions established in 1955
Public high schools in New York (state)
Schools in Nassau County, New York
1955 establishments in New York (state)